In electronics, short-channel effects occur in MOSFETs in which the channel length is comparable to the depletion layer widths of the source and drain junctions. These effects include, in particular, drain-induced barrier lowering, velocity saturation, quantum confinement and hot carrier degradation.

See also
 Channel length modulation
 Reverse short-channel effect

References 

MOSFETs
Transistor modeling